is a two-part Japanese drama series that aired in Japan on Fuji Television on August 19 and 20 2005. This is the third and final season of the series Water Boys, as its alternate title suggests, Water Boys Finale.

Plot

Cast
 Masatoshi Tanaka - Eita
 Uehara Kensaku - Keisuke Koide
 Satoru Nakao - Yuta Hiraoka
 Shunichirō Koma - Tasuku Emoto
 Kyoko Uehara - Manami Konishi
 Rena Kakihara - Ayana Sakai
 Michiru Buritani - Nonami Takizawa
 Toshimichi Koma - Takashi Ukaji
 Daigo Nakao - Yutaka Matsushige
 Kosaku Uehara - Toru Masuoka
 Haru Kakihara - Misako Watanabe
 Head Teacher - Akira Kubota
 Principal - Yoshiyuki Mori
 Zenjirō Hotta - 
 Manabu Hatori - Toshihide Tonesaku
 Kyoko Hanamura - Yu Kashii
 Futoshi Ishizuka - Tomoya Ishii
 Takashi Yasuda - Kei Tanaka
 Megumi Sakuma - Kaori Manabe
 Katsumi Nakayama
 Kimiko Sekiguchi
 Ben Nakajima
 Hiroshi Kanbe
 
 
 Sei Hiraizumi
 Yoshizumi Ishihara

Other Participants
 
 Yasuomi Sano
 
 
 
 
 
 
 
 
 栁橋朋典
 
 
 
 
 
 Kengo Kora

Music
The following songs used for synchronized swimming routines during the movie:
Hijō no License (非情のライセンス Ruthless License) by Shunsuke Kikuchi
We Built This City by Jefferson Airplane
Xanadu by Olivia Newton-John
Ne~e? (ね～え？ Hey?) by Aya Matsuura
Furui Nikki by Akiko Wada
Go West by Pet Shop Boys

References

External links

Japanese drama television series
2005 Japanese television series debuts
2005 Japanese television series endings
Fuji TV dramas